Nihon Maicom Kaihatsu, better known as NMK, was a Japanese video game developer that created various arcade games and shoot 'em ups. The company is best and mostly known for its Neo Geo title, Zed Blade.

Games developed
Argus
Arkista's Ring
Black Heart (video game)
Bomb Jack Twin
Butasan
Desert War
Double Dealer
Gunnail
Hacha Mecha Fighter
Legend of Makai
Mahjong Daireikai
Ninja Crusaders
Ninja Taro
P-47 Aces
P-47: The Phantom Fighter
Psychic 5
Quiz Gakuen Paradise
Quiz Panicuru Fantasy
Rapid Hero
Riot
Rolan's Curse
Rolan's Curse II
Saboten Bombers
Saint Dragon
Saiyūki World
Super Dimensional Fortress Macross II
Super Spacefortress Macross  (video game)
Task Force Harrier
Thunder Dragon
Thunder Dragon 2
USAAF Mustang
ValtricZed BladeCollaboration with DooyongChulgyeok D-Day / The Last Day - Arcade (1990)Gun Dealer - Arcade (1990)Yam! Yam!? / Wise Guy''  - Arcade (1990)

References

http://www.mobygames.com/company/nmk-co-ltd
http://gdri.smspower.org/wiki/index.php/NMK
 HG101's retrospective of NMK's collaboration with Korean firm Dooyong (Originally posted July 13, 2010; last updated March 2014)
 NMK's first system at UVList
 NMK16 System (arcade) at UVList

Video game companies established in 1985
Video game companies disestablished in 1999
Defunct video game companies of Japan
Video game development companies
Japanese companies established in 1985
Japanese companies disestablished in 1999
Hamster Corporation